Kevin Gorman is a British DJ, musician and remixer best known as Adesse Versions. His music has appeared on labels Ostgut Ton, Numbers, Ninja Tunes, Cocoon Recordings, Ed Banger and others.  His remix credits include the 1991 classic R&S release "Vamp" by Outlander, Leftfield for their Leftism album, Blossoms and Dita Von Teese.  From 2015 to 2016 Gorman ran an Adesse Versions show monthly on London's Rinse FM

Gorman, originally from Chester, England, first came to attention with a 2006 demo for DJ Hell, featuring track DMX, which featured heavy usage of the Beat Repeat feature of Ableton Live. This signing led DJ Hell to request a full album from Gorman for International Deejay Gigolo Records.

In March 2009 he launched his project 'Elements', a series of singles featuring the unique aspect of releasing all the component samples of the music alongside the original tracks, as well as a large collection of DJ tools, loops and alternate mixes. The project was released on Mikrowave, Gorman's own imprint. Also on Mikrowave, Gorman released the single "Seven Eight Nine", featuring a live version from the Berlin club the Berghain.

In 2010, Gorman provided music for the soundtrack to the film Shiver, a documentary concerning the controversial practice of shark finning. These Steve Reich inspired pieces became Frequency Phase Parts 1–3, released in 2012 on the Stroboscopic Artefacts label.

Selected discography
 Domenico Torti ft. Afrika Bambaataa - Radar (Adesse Versions remix) 2019
 Kerri Chandler - The Boom Can (Adesse Versions edit) 2018
 Dita Von Teese - La Vie Est Un Jeu (Adesse Versions remix) 2018
 Maribou State - Kingdom (Adesse Versions remix) 2018
 Leftfield - Original (Adesse Versions remix) 2017
 Blossoms - Getaway (Adesse Versions remix) 2016
 Frequency Phase Parts 1–3 (Stroboscopic Artefacts) 2012
 Cast (Curle) 2011
 7am Stepper (Ostgut Ton) 2010
 Traversable Wormhole – Relativistic Time Dilation (Kevin Gorman Remix)(CLR Recordings) 2010
 Phil Kieran – Playing with Shadows (Kevin Gorman Remix) (Cocoon Recordings) 2010
 Elements Parts 1–3 (Mikrowave) 2009
 SevenEightNine (live at Berghain) 12" (Mikrowave) 2008
 Chemistry Lock LP (International Deejay Gigolo Records) 2007 
 Outlander – Vamp (Kevin Gorman Remix) (International Deejay Gigolo Records) 2007
 Alloy Mental – God is Green (Kevin Gorman Remix) (Skint Records) 2007 
 DMX (International Deejay Gigolo Records) 2006

References

External links
 
 
 Kevin Gorman | Listen and Stream Free Music, Albums, New Releases, Photos, Videos – Official Myspace
 Telekom Electronic Beats - The Sound and Style of Beat-Driven Culture – Feature at Electronic Beats on Kevin Gorman's album
 mnml ssgs: mnml ssgs mx24: kevin gorman - elements – Mnml Ssg Podcast by Kevin Gorman

Living people
People from Chester
English DJs
Year of birth missing (living people)